United F.C. is a Bahamian football club based in Nassau. The club competes in the BFA Senior League, the top tier of Bahamian football.

The club was founded in 1974, and play their home matches in the 1,700-capacity, Roscow A. L. Davies Soccer Field.

Club

Squad

Management

Honors 
BFA Knock-Out Championship
Champions: (1) 1986

References

External links 
 Official Website
 Facebook page
 BFA Club Profile

Football clubs in the Bahamas
1974 establishments in the Bahamas
Association football clubs established in 1974